Christopher Neil Mackenzie (born 14 May 1972) is an English former footballer. He was a goalkeeper and most recently played for Corby Town in the Conference North.

Career

Mackenzie has also played for Hereford United and even scored a goal for them. The goal was scored against Barnet on the opening day of the 1995–96 season and the conceding goalkeeper was Maik Taylor, who was making his league début. As well as Shrewsbury and Hereford and several non-league clubs, Mackenzie has played in the Football League for Leyton Orient and Chester City.

Mackenzie signed for Shrewsbury on 15 May 2006 on the Bosman ruling from Chester City, where he had spent two years as predominantly first choice goalkeeper. He started the season as second choice goalkeeper behind Ryan Esson, but was handed his club début on 22 August 2006 in the League Cup match at Birmingham City, which Town lost 1–0. By mid-September Mackenzie had gained a spot in the starting line-up, and shortly afterwards, Esson suffered an injury in a reserve fixture, giving Mackenzie a chance to make an extended run in the team.

As Esson continued to struggle, Mackenzie found himself competing with loanee Scott Shearer for a place in the starting eleven. In the closing month of the season Shearer was being picked ahead of Mackenzie but (due to an agreement made prior to his loan signing) was not allowed to play against his parent-club Bristol Rovers in the League Two play-off final. At the age of 35, MacKenzie subsequently got his chance to line up at Wembley for the first time, though Shrewsbury succumbed to a 3–1 defeat.

On 21 September 2007, Mackenzie joined Conference side Kidderminster Harriers on a month-long loan to provide cover for the injured Scott Bevan. Despite having a bad debut at Aggborough, this was later extended by a further month, and he returned to Shrewsbury in November. However, Mackenzie made the permanent move to Kidderminster on 31 January 2008, as part of a deal that saw Bevan move in the opposite direction.

At the end of the 2007–08 season he was released by Kidderminster Harriers. Mackenzie then signed for Hinckley United in May 2008.

He rejoined his first club, Corby Town in May 2010, before signing for Alfreton Town in 2011. He helped Alfreton win promotion into the Conference Premier but Alfreton decided to turn to a full-time football club and Mackenzie did not wish to give up his career outside of football so rejoined Corby Town at the start of the 2011–12 season.

Mackenzie retired from football on 29 February 2012, during a team meeting which followed Corby Town's 3–1 home win against Long Buckby in the Hillier Senior Cup Semi-final, in which all the players were asked to take a pay-cut. This announcement came shortly after Mackenzie broke the record for being the oldest player ever to play for Corby Town.

Honours
 Football League Two play-off finalists, 2006–07, Shrewsbury Town.

References

External links

1972 births
Living people
Footballers from Northampton
Association football goalkeepers
English footballers
Corby Town F.C. players
Hereford United F.C. players
Rushden & Diamonds F.C. players
Leyton Orient F.C. players
Nuneaton Borough F.C. players
Telford United F.C. players
Chester City F.C. players
Shrewsbury Town F.C. players
Kidderminster Harriers F.C. players
Hinckley United F.C. players
Alfreton Town F.C. players
English Football League players
National League (English football) players